Cymindis pilosa is a species of ground beetle in the subfamily Harpalinae. It was described by Say in 1823.

References

pilosa
Beetles described in 1823